The following is a list of Bangladeshi playback singers:

Male
Abdul Alim
Pritom Ahmed
Shafin Ahmed
Asif Akbar
Rafiqul Alam (singer)
Fakir Alamgir
Ali Hossain
Fazlur Rahman Babu
Ayub Bachchu
Shyam Sundar Baishnab
Kabir Bakul
Balam
Biplob
Partha Barua
Kumar Bishwajit
Saidur Rahman Boyati
Tapan Chowdhury
Shuvro Dev
Fuad al Muqtadir
Syed Abdul Hadi
Haider Hussain
Abdul Jabbar
James
Shah Abdul Karim
Azam Khan
Shakib Khan
Tahsan Khan
Monir Khan
Khurshid Alam
Kaderi Kibria
Andrew Kishore
Imran Mahmudul
Bappa Mazumder
Khalid Hassan Milu
Kazi Shuvo
Muhin
Jolly Mukherjee
Mahmudun Nabi
Subir Nandi
Khan Ataur Rahman
Minar Rahman
Indra Mohan Rajbongshi
Rathindranath Roy
Kiran Chandra Roy
Arfin Rumey
Sadi Mohammad
Emon Saha
Abdul Karim Shah
Kalim Sharafi
Bari Siddiqui
Mohammad Ali Siddiqui
Chandan Sinha
Topu
S.I. Tutul
Pritom Hasan
Ferdous Wahid
Habib Wahid
Rafiul Islam

Female
Nina Hamid
Shammi Akhtar
Akhi Alomgir
Anusheh Anadil
Anjuman Ara Begum
Ferdous Ara
Firoza Begum
Momtaz Begum
Rezwana Choudhury Bannya
Samina Chowdhury
Priyanka Gope
Mila Islam
Kanak Chapa
Elita Karim
Uma Khan
Anupama Mukti
Dilshad Nahar Kona
Konal
Krishnokoli
Runa Laila
Haimanti Rakshit Das
Lehat Lemis
Sania Sultana Liza
Mehreen Mahmud
Chandana Mazumdar
Mitali Mukherjee
Fahmida Nabi
Nazmun Munira Nancy
Baby Naznin
Nodi
Oyshee
Farida Parveen
Sabrina Porshi
Ferdausi Rahman
Shahnaz Rahmatullah
Rizia Parveen
Meher Afroz Shaon
Shithi Saha
Kangalini Sufia
Abida Sultana
Tishma
Farida Yasmin
Nilufar Yasmin
Sabina Yasmin 
Shimul Yousuf
Shakila Zafar
Fatema Tuz Zohra
Shayan

Lists of singers
Lists of women in music